The A977 is an A road in Scotland, connecting the Kincardine Bridge in Fife to the M90 motorway at Kinross.

Route
The A977 runs between the M90 junction 6 and a roundabout at the southern end of the Kincardine Bridge

Places along the route
The road passes through several villages and hamlets on its route.  Approaching from the south, it passes through Forestmill, Blairingone, Powmill, Crook of Devon, before reaching the M90.

Residents' concerns
The new Clackmannanshire Bridge has led to an increase in heavy traffic using the A977 to reach the M90 motorway providing a quicker route for North East traffic from Glasgow and the west. The road has also become a favourable route for many UK and European hauliers in recent years seeking an alternative route to avoid DSVA enforcement activities on the M9 at Stirling.  This has caused to concern among people who live in communities on the road. MSP Liz Smith raised the matter in the Scottish Parliament but was told that this was a council matter.  She has since raised the matter with Perth and Kinross Council.

A package of traffic mitigation measures was approved in February 2010.

See also
 Perth and Kinross Council
 County of Kinross
 Clackmannanshire

Notes

External links
 Fossoway Community Council

Roads in Scotland
Transport in Fife
Transport in Clackmannanshire
Transport in Perth and Kinross